Tommaso Vailatti (born February 1, 1986, in Venaria Reale, Piedmont) is an Italian footballer who plays for Ternana Calcio.

Club career
Nicknamed "Riki", he joined Torino's youth system at the age of 16. He began his professional career in Serie B while playing for Torino. In his first season with the club he made ten scoreless appearances. His second season saw him make 13 appearances and score his first professional goal against Cremonese. In 2006, he received the Tuttomercatoweb Cercasi Calciatore Disperatamente award which recognizes the best young football player in Italy.

When Torino was promoted to Serie A, he was loaned out to Vicenza during the 2006-07 season where he played in twenty games but scored no goals. For the 2007-08 season, he was brought back to Torino, where on August 25, 2007, in his Serie A debut, scored an equalizing goal against Lazio giving Torino a 2–2 draw. In the 2008 January transfer window, he was loaned out to Livorno.

During the 2009 season Vailatti returned to Torino for the start of the 2008-09 season. On May 31, 2009, he scored a goal in a 3–2 loss to Roma. After not featuring regularly during 2009–10 season Vailatti started to receive interest from various foreign clubs. He was offered a deal with Romanian club CS Gaz Metan Mediaş and Swiss club FC Locarno during the winter transfer season but rejected the moves. It was also reported that Vailatti was offered a deal with New York Red Bulls.

In September 2010 he goes to Ternana Calcio

Honours

Club
Torino F.C.
Serie B
Seria A Playoffs (2): 2004-05; 2005-06

Individual
  Cercasi Calciatore Disperatamente (Best young football player of Italy) : 2006

References

External links
Torino FC Profile
torcidagranata.it 

1986 births
Living people
People from Venaria Reale
Italian footballers
Italy youth international footballers
Association football midfielders
Serie A players
Serie B players
Serie C players
Torino F.C. players
L.R. Vicenza players
U.S. Livorno 1915 players
Ternana Calcio players
Treviso F.B.C. 1993 players
Footballers from Piedmont
Sportspeople from the Metropolitan City of Turin